Compsoscorpius is an extinct genus of scorpions from the Carboniferous of France and the United Kingdom.

References

External links 
 
 

Prehistoric scorpions
Prehistoric arachnid genera
Scorpion genera
Fossils of France
Carboniferous arthropods of Europe
Fossil taxa described in 1949